Shiva is an Indian animated action television series that began in 2015 on Nickelodeon Sonic and Nickelodeon. The series is produced by Cosmos-Maya and Viacom18, and is one of the highest-rated children's programs in India.

Plot 

Shiva is a nine-year-old boy who lives with his grandparents in a fictional city named Vedas in India. As a child hero with supernatural powers, he fights villains who attempt to disrupt life in the city. He assists a local policeman named Laddoo Singh, who wants to catch the criminals.

Characters
 Shiva is a heroic nine-year-old boy with great strength, bravery, and intelligence. He has a bike that can fly and float on water. He is a good student and lives with his grandparents. Although he is an expert fighter, he never misuses his talents. In addition to his engineering talent, which allows him to make different gadgets, he is also good at cooking. He has three best friends: Aditya, Uday, and Reva.
 Aditya, also known as 'Adi', is a friend of Shiva. He speaks proudly about his bravery but is very scared. He joins Shiva in all his adventures and is very loyal to his family and friends.  He claims that he is regarded as a hero in his own village as Shiva in the city of Vedas City.
 Uday also known as 'Udi' is a friend of Shiva. He gets hungry when scared. He is strong. In every mystery, he thinks that the hand before these problems are aliens! Sometimes Reva, another character in this cartoon, becomes angry with them because of his thought about aliens!
 Reva is a friend of Shiva. She is a very beautiful and intelligent girl. She always risks her life when her friend is in danger. She believes Shiva can do anything. 
 'Mr. Laddu Singh is the Police Inspector of Vedas City. He is honest but he is not very intelligent. In some episodes, he claims that he is the guru of Shiva after the criminal is caught. He is always helped by Shiva in performing his duties. He likes reporters to take his interview. He tells being proud that he has caught the criminal with great heroism which leads him to danger sometimes. Actually, he is a liar in the interviews. But he lies in the interview every time and no one knows that he is lying in the interview. However, everybody knows who is the real hero. He is one of the comedic characters in this cartoon. He is a very frightened inspector.
 Pedaram is the assistant of Mr. Ladoo Singh. Sometimes when Laddoo Singh tries to speak proudly, he leaks the truth.
 Nanaji name is Acharya. He is Shiva's nana (maternal grandfather) and his main talent is singing Hindustani Classical music in which he sings his best that everyone thinks he sings worst. When he sings his voice makes everybody fly away as if a tornado has come.  With this ability sometimes he helps Shiva.
 Nani is the Nani (maternal grandmother) of Shiva. She always tells Shiva not to fight with anyone. When Laddoo Singh comes to Shiva to ask for help, she tries to get him out. But as seen in the episode namely The last Ninja fighter, Nani told that she is never unwilling to let Shiva fight against any criminal as Shiva is fighting for the betterment of people as well as for Vedas City. In an episode namely, Shiva Ka Vadha(which means Shiva's Obstacle, when translated to English) criminals cheated on Nani and made her make a promise to Shiva not to fight against anyone. However, she understood that at last and let him fight for the truth.
 Swami is the neighbour of Shiva. He lives with his wife. He often becomes irritated hearing the songs sung by Nanaji.
 Swami's wife is the neighbour of Shiva. She loves shopping every day.
 Bheem Singh works in the house of Shiva. He is a very thin person. He helps Nani by disturbing Nana while singing and throwing Laddoo Singh out of their house when he comes to Shiva for help.
 Neha is the niece of Swami. She has an extraordinary ability to detect any secret code, password, etc. She is seen rarely in episodes like in "The Secret Code". The criminals tried to kidnap her to open a locker full of gold bars in that episode. She is not any of the main characters of this cartoon. But in recent episodes, she is not seen in any of the episodes.
 Cheapy It's a Robot
 King GoGo He is king of Xtreme city

Voice actors

Movies

Episodes

Season 1

season 3

Season 4

season 5

Season 6

Season 7

Broadcast

See also
 List of Indian animated television series
 Rudra: Boom Chik Chik Boom
 Nickelodeon India
 Nickelodeon Sonic

References

External links 
 Shiva Cartoon/ Available On Voot Kids

2015 Indian television series debuts
Indian children's animated action television series
Nickelodeon (Indian TV channel) original programming
Animated television series about children
Indian children's animated superhero television series